Zhangzha, formerly Jiuzhaigou, is a township-level division under Jiuzhaigou County, Ngawa Tibetan and Qiang Autonomous Prefecture, Sichuan Province, China, with an area of , and a permanent population of 13,593 as of 2020.

History 
In 1992, the town of Jiuzhaigou following the merger of Longkang Township and Tazang Township. On June 19, 1998, Nanping County, which governed the town, was renamed to Jiuzhaigou County, prompting the town of Jiuzhaigou to change its name to Zhangha after the village where its government was seated.

Administrative divisions 

Zhangzha has jurisdiction over 7 residential communities and 11 administrative villages.

Residential communities 
The town's residential communities are as follows:

 Heye Community
 Shuzheng Community
 Zharu Community
 Zhangzha Community
 Pengfeng Community
 Longkang Community
 Ganhaizi Community

Administrative villages 
The town's administrative villages are as follows:

 Zhangzha Village
 Longkang Village
 Congya Village
 Yazha Village
 Shaba Village
 Erdaoqiao Village
 Shangsizhai Village

 Langzhai Village
 Zhongcha Village

 Yongzhu Village
 Pengfeng Village

Jiuzhaigou Earthquake 

On August 8, 2017, Zhangzha Town was the epicenter of the earthquake, causing severe power failure in Jiuzhaigou County and damage to the formerly pristine Jiuzhaigou Scenic Area.

Demographics 
The town is home to 7,524 residents registered under the hukou system, belonging to 2,924 households. However, as of 2020, it has a higher permanent population, totaling 13,593.

Zhangzha is predominantly ethnically Tibetan, but has a sizable Han Chinese and Hui population.

Education 
As of 2017, Zhangzha has 1 kindergarten, 10 primary schools, and 1 middle school.

References 

Towns in Sichuan
Jiuzhaigou County